Thomas Dolling Bolton (1841 – 16 December 1906), was a British Liberal Party politician.

Family
He was a son of James Thomas Bolton, of Solihull, Warwickshire and Mary Ratcliffe, daughter of the Rev. William Boughey Dolling.

Career
He was a solicitor, admitted in 1866. He was a member of Windsor Town Council. He was a company director of the Rhymney Coal and Iron Company. He served as a Justice of the Peace in Herefordshire. He sat as Liberal MP for Derbyshire North East from the 1886 General Election until his death in December 1906. He was first elected at the 1886 General Election, holding a seat that had been won by a Liberal when it was created in 1885.

Derbyshire North East was a constituency that was dominated by the mining industry. He developed a good working relationship with the Derbyshire Miners Association and arranged, free of charge, for the conveyance of the land for the miners association new building in 1891, and advised them to register under the Trade Union Act 1871 introduced by Gladstone's Liberal Government, so that they could legally hold the property.

In April, 1897, he presented to Parliament petitions in favour of the Eight Hours' Bill from the miners of the North-East Derbyshire division. This petition argued for a maximum working day.

As a supporter of the temperance movement, he was a formidable opponent of the Conservative Government's Licensing Bill.

References

Who Was Who; http://www.ukwhoswho.com

1841 births
1906 deaths
Liberal Party (UK) MPs for English constituencies
UK MPs 1886–1892
UK MPs 1892–1895
UK MPs 1895–1900
UK MPs 1900–1906
UK MPs 1906–1910